The Illusion is a 1969 album by the Illusion. It was released on the Steed Records label and reached No. 69 in the Billboard albums chart and stayed on the chart for 27 weeks. An edited version of the album's first track, "Did You See Her Eyes", reached No. 32 on the Billboard singles chart.

Track listing

Personnel
 John Vinci - vocals (1, 2, 4, 6-9)
 Richie Cerniglia - lead guitar, vocals
 Mike Maniscalco - rhythm guitar, vocals (3, 5)
 Chuck Alder - bass
 Mike Ricciardella - drums
Audio engineer: Fred Weinberg
Source: Album sleeve credits
Album cover photograph by Joel Brodsky

References

1969 debut albums
The Illusion (band) albums
Steed Records albums